Jesús Álvarez may refer to:

 Jesús Álvarez (journalist) (1926–1970), Spanish journalist
 Jesús Álvarez (footballer) (born 1981), Peruvian footballer